The 6th of September Express is a  long daily passenger train operated by TCDD Taşımacılık. The train runs from Basmane Terminal in İzmir to Soma, Manisa in western Turkey. The train provides local service on between the two destinations and the total scheduled time of a trip is 3 hours and 33 minutes.

The 6th of September Express was inaugurated on 1 September 2007, as a second train service from İzmir to Bandırma. Following a tunnel collapse on 5 March 2016, the train was temporarily cut back to Soma. Once the tunnel was rebuilt and train service returned, the 6th of September Express continued to operate only to Soma for a year. It is now extended to its former terminus.

Due to the COVID-19 pandemic, the 6th of September Express was suspended on 12 March 2021.

References

Named passenger trains of Turkey
Railway services introduced in 2007
İzmir
Soma District
Transport in İzmir Province
Transport in Manisa Province